Theewaterskloof may refer to:
 Theewaterskloof Dam, near Villiersdorp, Western Cape, South Africa
 Theewaterskloof Local Municipality, governing Villiersdorp and the surrounding area in the Western Cape, South Africa